Ashley John Sutton (born 15 January 1994) is a British racing driver, and three time British Touring Car Champion, who currently competes in the British Touring Car Championship with NAPA Racing UK.

After winning the Renault Clio Cup UK in 2015, Sutton moved up to the British Touring Car Championship for the 2016 season with MG Racing RCIB Insurance. He won one race in his début season, before moving to Adrian Flux Subaru Racing for the 2017 season. Sutton failed to score a point in the opening meeting, but won six races thereafter to win the championship, the youngest champion since 1966. He moved to Laser Tools Racing in 2020, and would win the championship back to back in 2020 and 2021. He moved to NAPA Racing UK for the 2022 season.

Racing career
Sutton began his career in karting in 2000 and raced in karting up until 2009, when he switched to the 750MC Formula Vee Championship. He went on to win the Rookie of year award that season, finishing 4th in the overall championship with assistance from an established 2 Car team (AMP). He made a return to racing in the 2014 British Formula Ford Championship after having been forced to sit out two and half years of racing, following a road car accident. He finished 3rd in the championship that year, taking 5 wins, 16 podiums, 4 pole positions and 10 fastest laps. For 2015 he switched to the Renault Clio Cup United Kingdom, entering the championship with support from the British Touring Car Championship team, Team BMR. Winning the championship that year, with 6 wins, 14 podiums, 4 pole positions and 4 fastest laps. In March 2016, it was announced that Sutton would make his British Touring Car Championship debut with MG Racing RCIB Insurance driving a MG6 GT. He finished 4th in the first race of the season and took his first win in a wet race three at croft. He also won the Jack Sears Trophy. A championship for all the rookies to compete for in their first season. For 2017 Sutton moved back to Team BMR as expected. He failed to score a point at the first round at brands hatch but since has taken wins at Oulton Park, Croft, Snetterton, Knockhill and Rockingham. He held a 10 point lead at the summit of the championship heading into the finale. Sutton clinched the title in the final race of the season after rival Turkington had earlier won the second race from 15th on the grid to keep the championship alive. However, on lap 2 of race three, Turkington was hit, therefore ending his chances and confirming Sutton as the champion, the youngest since John Fitzpatrick in 1966. During his title defence in 2018, Sutton won six races, the most of any driver during the season but came fourth overall.

Sutton competed in the inaugural season of the TCR UK series, winning two races of a truncated campaign with Verizon Connect Racing.

Personal life
Sutton was educated at Birchwood High School, where he studied auto mechanics and engineering.

Racing record

750MC Formula Vee
Ash Sutton started his car racing career in the 750 Motor Club's Formula Vee Championship driving a Storm. He finished fourth in the championship, taking three victories, coming at Castle Combe, Brands Hatch and Pembrey. He took a further five podiums.

Complete Renault UK Clio Cup results
(key) (Races in bold indicate pole position)

Complete British Touring Car Championship results
(key) (Races in bold indicate pole position – 1 point awarded just in first race; races in italics indicate fastest lap – 1 point awarded all races; * signifies that driver led race for at least one lap – 1 point given all races)

Complete TCR Europe Touring Car Series results
(key) (Races in bold indicate pole position) (Races in italics indicate fastest lap)

References

External links
 
 
 
 

1994 births
Living people
British Touring Car Championship drivers
British Touring Car Championship Champions
English racing drivers
British racing drivers
Renault UK Clio Cup drivers
W Racing Team drivers
TCR Europe Touring Car Series drivers